Indios de Ciudad Juárez Reserves was a Mexican football club that started play in the newly formed Campeonato Sub-17 y Sub-20 de México.

See also
Indios de Ciudad Juárez

External links
 Official Site

Indios de Ciudad Juárez
Football clubs in Chihuahua (state)
2009 establishments in Mexico
Sports teams in Ciudad Juárez

de:Indios de Ciudad Juárez
es:Indios de Ciudad Juárez